A list of animated feature films first released in 1987.

Highest-grossing animated films of the year

See also
 List of animated television series of 1987

References

 Feature films
1987
1987-related lists